Kankakee Township is one of thirteen townships in Jasper County, Indiana, United States. As of the 2010 census, its population was 988 and it contained 410 housing units.

Kankakee Township was established in 1856.

Geography

Unincorporated towns
 Tefft

Adjacent townships
 Pleasant Township, Porter County (north)
 Dewey Township, LaPorte County (northeast)
 Railroad Township, Starke County (east)
 Cass Township, Pulaski County (southeast)
 Walker Township (southwest)
 Wheatfield Township (west)

Major highways
  Indiana State Road 10
  Indiana State Road 49

Education
Kankakee Township residents are eligible to obtain a free library card from the Jasper County Public Library.

References
 
 United States Census Bureau cartographic boundary files

External links
 Indiana Township Association
 United Township Association of Indiana

Townships in Jasper County, Indiana
Townships in Indiana